Seyfe can refer to:

 Seyfe, Çorum
 Seyfe, Suluova